Paladin is a 1988 video game published by Omnitrend Software.

Gameplay
Paladin is a game in which the player character is a paladin, a leader of a small fantasy combat unit.

Reception
Jasper Sylvester reviewed the game for Computer Gaming World, and stated that "In short, those who liked the "feel" of play in Breach, but prefer a fantasy environment shouldn't miss Paladin."

Reviews
The Games Machine - Oct, 1989
ACE (Advanced Computer Entertainment) - Apr, 1989

References

External links
Review in Info
Review in Amiga Computing
Review in Page 6
Review in ST Log
Review in Computer Play
Review in Ahoy!'s AmigaUser

1988 video games
Amiga games
Atari ST games
DOS games
Fantasy video games
Tactical role-playing video games
Top-down video games
Video games developed in the United States